Inauguration of Richard Nixon may refer to:

First inauguration of Richard Nixon, 1969
Second inauguration of Richard Nixon, 1973

See also